Wang Hui (born 7 July 1984) is a Chinese judoka. She competed in the Women's 57 kg event at the 2012 Summer Olympics.

References

External links
 
 
 

1984 births
Living people
Chinese female judoka
Olympic judoka of China
Judoka at the 2012 Summer Olympics
People from Binzhou
Sportspeople from Shandong
20th-century Chinese women
21st-century Chinese women